Fu Hua (born August 1964) is a Chinese politician who is the current president of Xinhua News Agency, in office since June 2022.

He is a representative of the 20th National Congress of the Chinese Communist Party and a member of the 20th Central Committee of the Chinese Communist Party.

Early life and education
Fu was born in Rudong County (now Rudong), Jiangsu, in August 1964. In 1985, he graduated from Yangzhou Normal College (now Yangzhou University), where he majored in Chinese language and literature.

Political career
Fu entered the workforce in July 1985, and joined the Chinese Communist Party (CCP) in December 1993.

Fu worked in China Business Daily before being assigned to the State Council. He than successively served as assistant governor and deputy governor of Fangshan District and head of the Publicity Department of the CCP Xicheng District Committee in Beijing. He was deputy head of the Publicity Department of the CCP Beijing Municipal Committee in February 2010 and subsequently deputy secretary-general of the CCP Beijing Municipal Committee in July 2011.

Fu became president and party branch secretary of Beijing Daily in April 2014, and served until November 2016, when he was appointed vice president of the All-China Journalists Association. He had also briefly served as executive deputy head of the Publicity Department of the CCP Beijing Municipal Committee. In April 2017, he was chosen as editor-in-chief of Economic Daily, a state-owned newspaper focusing on economic reports.

Fu was appointed head of the Publicity Department of the CCP Guangdong Provincial Committee in March 2018 and was admitted to member of the Standing Committee of the CCP Guangdong Provincial Committee, the province's top authority.

In February 2020, Fu was recalled to the central government and appointed deputy head of the Publicity Department of the Chinese Communist Party.

Fu was appointed editor-in-chief of Xinhua News Agency in June 2021, and was promoted to president a year later.

References

1964 births
Living people
People from Rudong County

Yangzhou University alumni
Renmin University of China alumni
People's Republic of China politicians from Jiangsu
Chinese Communist Party politicians from Jiangsu
Members of the 20th Central Committee of the Chinese Communist Party